Kim Clijsters and Jelena Dokić were the defending champions, but only Clijsters competed with year with Mia Buric

Buric and Clijsters reached the final, but they were defeated by the Italian pairing of Flavia Pennetta and Roberta Vinci, 7–5, 5–7, 6–4.

Draw

Finals

Top half

Bottom half

References

External links
Main Draw

Girls' Doubles
French Open, 1999 Girls' Doubles